Mensje van Keulen (born 10 June 1946), pseudonym of Mensje Francina van der Steen, is a Dutch writer.

Career 

Early in her career van Keulen made drawings, stories and poems for the magazine Propria Cures. Van Keulen made her debut in 1972 with the book Bleekers zomer. Van Keulen was editor of the magazine Maatstaf between 1973 and 1981.

In 1986, van Keulen won the Zilveren Griffel award for her first children's book Tommie Station (1985). In 1991, she won the Nienke van Hichtum-prijs for her children's book Vrienden van de maan. A few years later, she received a Vlag en Wimpel award in 1993 for her book Meneer Ratti.

For her entire oeuvre she won the Charlotte Köhler Prize in 2011. She also won the Constantijn Huygens Prize in 2014 for her entire oeuvre.

Van Keulen's children's books have been illustrated by various illustrators, including Thé Tjong-Khing, Willem van Malsen and Jan Jutte.

Some of van Keulen's work has been published under the pseudonyms Josien Meloen and Constant P. Cavalry.

Politics 

Van Keulen was also lijstduwer for the Party for the Animals during the European Parliament election in the Netherlands in 2004 as well as in 2014.

She was also on the list of candidates during the 2006 Dutch general election as well as the 2017 Dutch general election.

Personal life 

Van Keulen has been a vegetarian from age 20. Van Keulen was married and she has one son.

Awards 

 1986: Zilveren Griffel, Tommie Station
 1991: Nienke van Hichtum-prijs, Vrienden van de maan
 1993: Vlag en Wimpel, Meneer Ratti
 2003: Annie Romeinprijs, entire oeuvre
 2011: Charlotte Köhler Prize, entire oeuvre
 2014: Constantijn Huygens Prize

References

External links 

 Mensje van Keulen, Nederlands Letterenfonds
 Mensje van Keulen (in Dutch), Digital Library for Dutch Literature
 Mensje van Keulen (in Dutch), jeugdliteratuur.org

1946 births
Living people
Dutch children's writers
20th-century Dutch women writers
21st-century Dutch women writers
Dutch women children's writers
Constantijn Huygens Prize winners
Pseudonymous women writers
Nienke van Hichtum Prize winners
Writers from The Hague
20th-century pseudonymous writers
21st-century pseudonymous writers